Bitterroot College is a program of the University of Montana located in Hamilton, Montana, United States. In operation since 2009, the program offers an Associate of Arts degree and various certificate programs.

References

Hamilton, Montana

Buildings and structures in Ravalli County, Montana
Education in Ravalli County, Montana